Peia is a comune (municipality) in the Province of Bergamo in the Italian region of Lombardy, located about  northeast of Milan and about  northeast of Bergamo.

The municipality of Peia contains the frazioni (subdivisions, mainly villages and hamlets) Peia Bassa  and Cima Peia.

Peia borders the following municipalities: Bianzano, Gandino, Leffe, Ranzanico.

Demographic evolution

References